Lipi may refer to:

People
 Bruno Lipi (born 1994), Albanian football player
 Syeda Zakia Noor Lipi, Bangladesh politician
 Tayeba Begum Lipi (born 1969), Bangladeshi artist

Places
 Lipí, Czech Republic

Other
 LIPI, the Indonesian Institute of Sciences
 Lipi (script)